Tick fever may refer to:

African tick fever; see Spirochaeta duttoni
Bovine Babesiosis
Ruminant Anaplasmosis
Colorado tick fever
Equine piroplasmosis
Sheep tick fever; see Lyme disease
Tick-borne disease